Bear Lake may refer to one of several lakes in the U.S. state of Oregon:

See also
 List of lakes in Oregon

Lakes of Oregon